All the Time may refer to:
All the Time (album), a 2020 album by Jessy Lanza
"All the Time" (Kitty Wells song), 1959
"All the Time" (The Strokes song), 2012
"All the Time" (Playmen song), 2012
"All the Time" (Zara Larsson song), 2019
"All the Time", a song from the 1958 musical Oh, Captain!
"All the Time", a song by Barry Manilow from his 1976 album This One's for You
"All the Time", a song by Jeremy Camp from his 2002 album Stay
"All the Time", a song by Candy Coded from their 2015 extended play Moonlight
"All the Time", a song by Green Day from their 1997 album Nimrod
"All the Time", a 2018 song by Kim Petras
"All the Time", a song by David James from his 2020 extended play If I Were You